"We Were Us" is a song written by Nicolle Galyon, Jimmy Robbins, and Jon Nite and recorded by New Zealand-born Australian country music singer Keith Urban as a duet with American country music singer Miranda Lambert. It was released in September 2013 as the second international single and third overall from Urban's 2013 album Fuse.

Content
The song is the narrators' reminiscence of lost love. Lambert sings the first verse, Urban sings the second verse, and both sing the choruses and bridge together. The song is set in the key of D major with a vocal range of A–A.

Critical reception
Giving it 4 out of 5 stars, Matt Bjorke of Roughstock compared its theme favorably to "Springsteen" by Eric Church, and praised the blending of Urban's and Lambert's voices, although he criticized the production as "a bit too busy and loud".

"We Were Us" won Musical Event of the Year at the 2014 CMA Awards.

Personnel
From liner notes to Fuse:
Nathan Chapman — drum programming, bass guitar, acoustic guitar, keyboards
Miranda Lambert — vocals
 Keith Urban — vocals, acoustic guitar, electric guitar, ganjo

Music video
The music video was directed by Reid Long and Becky Fluke and premiered in November 2013.

Commercial performance
The song debuted at number 49 on Country Airplay for the week ending 21 September 2013. The next week, it climbed to number 29, while debuting at 24 on Hot Country Songs. Its chart run has overlapped with Lambert's single "All Kinds of Kinds", the fifth from her album Four the Record. The song has sold 566,000 copies in the US as of January 2014. This would be Keith's last top 30 hit on the Billboard Hot 100 until "Blue Ain't Your Color" in 2016.

Charts and certifications

Weekly charts

Year-end charts

Certifications

References

2013 singles
Keith Urban songs
Miranda Lambert songs
Male–female vocal duets
Songs written by Jimmy Robbins
Song recordings produced by Nathan Chapman (record producer)
Capitol Records Nashville singles
2013 songs
Songs written by Jon Nite
Songs written by Nicolle Galyon